The boxing events of the 1991 Mediterranean Games were held in Athens, Greece.

Medalists

Medal table

References
1991 Mediterranean Games report at the International Committee of Mediterranean Games (CIJM) website
1991 Mediterranean Games boxing tournament at Amateur Boxing Results

Mediterranean Games
Sports at the 1991 Mediterranean Games
1991